The Central American red-tailed hawk (Buteo jamaicensis costaricensis) is a subspecies of red-tailed hawk resident from Nicaragua to Panama. This subspecies is relatively small. This subspecies is arguably the most handsomely colored in typical adult plumage. This subspecies is dark brown above and heavily pigmented dorsally, the white of the breast contrasting with a deep rufous abdominal band which contains black streaks and spots. Meanwhile, the flanks, wing linings and sides are an unbarred deep rufous. In some birds, the rich rufous color continues to the underside. The chest is much less heavily streaked than in northern migrants western red-tailed hawk (B. j. calurus) to Central America. Unlike other Central American races of red-tailed hawk, there seems to be no dark morph in this subspecies.

References 

Central American red-tailed hawk